Barry Jones (born 30 June 1970) is an English former footballer. He is a defender who played over 300 Football League games for Wrexham and York City, having begun his professional career with Liverpool. At Liverpool he made one first team appearance; coming on as a substitute in a UEFA Cup tie against Kuusysi Lahti in October 1991. He played 36 games and scored two goals for Southport in the Northern Premier League in the 2003–04 season. He made two appearances for Bangor City after signing in August 2006.

References

External links

Profile at LFCHistory.net

1970 births
Living people
Sportspeople from Prescot
English footballers
Association football defenders
Prescot Cables F.C. players
Liverpool F.C. players
Wrexham A.F.C. players
York City F.C. players
Southport F.C. players
Runcorn F.C. Halton players
Bangor City F.C. players
English Football League players
Cymru Premier players